Breckin is a surname. Notable people with the surname include:

 Ian Breckin (born 1975), former English footballer
 John Breckin (born 1953), former English footballer
 Mike Breckin (born 1946), former British fencer 
 Sian Breckin (born 1982), British actress

See also
 Breckin Meyer (born 1974), American actor etc.